The 2022 FAI Cup Final, known as the 2022 Extra.ie FAI Cup Final for sponsorship reasons, was the final match of the 2022 FAI Cup, the national association football cup of the Republic of Ireland. The match took place on Sunday 13 November at the Aviva Stadium in Dublin, and was contested by Derry City and Shelbourne.

Derry City won the game 4-0 to win the cup for the sixth time, it was also the biggest margin of victory in an FAI cup final.

Route to the final

Derry City

Shelbourne

Pre-match
Derry City had won the cup on five previous occasions, 1989, 1995, 2002, 2006, and 2012. Shelbourne had won it seven times in 1939, 1960, 1963, 1993, 1996, 1997, and 2000.
The two teams previously met in the 1997 FAI Cup final with Shelbourne winning the game 2-0.
The match was broadcast live on RTÉ Two and RTÉ Two HD in the Republic of Ireland and Northern Ireland, Via Rte Radio 1 Sunday Sport and via the RTÉ Player worldwide.

Match

Summary
The opening goal came in the 18th minute, when Jamie McGonigle finished into the left corner of the net after a low cross from Ryan Graydon on the right.
It was 2-0 in the 35th minute when Cameron McJannet scored from six yards out after the ball broke to him from a clearance by Shelbourne defender Shane Griffin.
In the 61st minute McJannet got his second and Derry's third when the ball came off his knee and into the net from a corner on the left by Michael Duffy.
In injury time Derry were awarded a penalty when Jordan McEneff was brought down from behind in the area by Luke Byrne, with McEneff making it 4-0 shooting the penalty down the middle of the net.

Details

References

External links
Official Site

FAI Cup finals